Louis W. Pahl (December 15, 1900 – March 1, 1966) was an American football player.  A native of St. Paul, Minnesota, he played professional football in the National Football League (NFL) as a fullback for the Minneapolis Marines. He appeared in 11 NFL games, 10 as a starter, during the 1923 and 1924 seasons.

References

1900 births
1966 deaths
People from Saint Paul, Minnesota
Players of American football from Minnesota
Minneapolis Marines players